Vojtech, Called the Orphan is a 1990 Czechoslovak drama film directed by Zdeněk Tyc. The film was selected as the Czechoslovak entry for the Best Foreign Language Film at the 63rd Academy Awards, but was not accepted as a nominee.

Cast
 Petr Forman as Vojta
 Barbora Lukešová as Anezka
 Jana Dolanská as Blazena
 Vlastimil Zavřel as Lojza
 Jirí Hájek as Caretaker
 Břetislav Rychlík as Venca
 Jaroslav Mareš as Juz

See also
 List of submissions to the 63rd Academy Awards for Best Foreign Language Film
 List of Czechoslovak submissions for the Academy Award for Best Foreign Language Film

References

External links
 

1990 films
1990 drama films
1990 directorial debut films
Czechoslovak drama films
1990s Czech-language films